Sandra Kleinová (born 8 May 1978) is a retired Czech tennis player.

Born in Prague, Kleinová reached the Fed Cup final in Nagoya in 1995. She was part of the Czech Republic Fed Cup team in 1997.

Her highest WTA singles ranking is 41st, which she reached in 1998, and her career high in doubles was at 209, set on 12 June 2000.

Kleinová was again part of the Czech Republic Fed Cup team in 2002. She defeated Elena Dementieva in the first round of Wimbledon in 2004.

WTA career finals

Singles: 1 (runner-up)

ITF finals

Singles (6–4)

Doubles (4–2)

External links
 
 

1978 births
Living people
Czech female tennis players
Tennis players from Prague